The Hygieostatic Bat Roost is located in Kendall County, approximately  east of Comfort on the south side of RM 473, in the U.S. state of Texas. It was erected in 1918 on property owned by former San Antonio Mayor Pro Tem Albert Steves, who had commissioned San Antonio health officer Dr. Charles A. R. Campbell to design the structure. One dormer serves as an entrance for the bats, while the other dormers are ornamental. The lower portion of the tower allows access for humans.

Campbell had been researching a method of controlling the spread of mosquito-carried malaria, by encouraging the insect's natural enemy, the bat. Although mosquitoes have other natural enemies, many of them are active only during the daytime hours, while bats fly in search of food during the night when mosquitoes are most active. Campbell patented his bat roost design and erected several of them in the San Antonio area beginning in 1907. When the bat roost was built on his Kendall County property, Steves coined the name Hygieostatic Bat Roost based on the Greek words hygiea (health) and stasis (standing). The descendants of Albert Steves still own the property where the tower is located. It was designated a Recorded Texas Historic Landmark in 1981. In 1983, the roost was added to the National Register of Historic Places.

See also

National Register of Historic Places listings in Kendall County, Texas
Recorded Texas Historic Landmarks in Kendall County

References

External links

Bat roosts
Buildings and structures completed in 1918
Buildings and structures in Kendall County, Texas
Agricultural buildings and structures on the National Register of Historic Places in Texas
Recorded Texas Historic Landmarks
Biological pest control
National Register of Historic Places in Kendall County, Texas